King Airfield Hangar is a historic airplane hangar on Middleboro Avenue in Taunton, Massachusetts on private property near the Taunton Municipal Airport.

The hangar was built in 1919 as part of "King's Field", one of the first private airports in New England, and is its oldest surviving remnant. The airfield was built by Henry King on his dairy farm. King and his family established a flying school with the purchase of a Curtiss Jenny World War I surplus airplane. The Kings also offered sightseeing tours over the Taunton area.

In the 1940s and 50s the family acquired a small fleet of aircraft and operated an air taxi service. Local businesses also hangared their planes at the airfield. In 1959, the main runway was paved and improved to 3,400 feet. Despite lack of obvious necessity, the airfield was taken in the 1960s from the King family by eminent domain by the city and renamed Taunton Municipal Airport. The small portion of the original farm where the 1919 hangar is located was not part of the eminent domain.

The historic hangar was added to the National Register of Historic Places in 1984.

See also
National Register of Historic Places listings in Taunton, Massachusetts

References

National Register of Historic Places in Taunton, Massachusetts
Transportation buildings and structures on the National Register of Historic Places in Massachusetts
Buildings and structures in Taunton, Massachusetts
Aircraft hangars in the United States
Transportation buildings and structures in Bristol County, Massachusetts
Aircraft hangars on the National Register of Historic Places
1919 establishments in Massachusetts